The  was the currency of Korçë, Albania, issued in 1921. It was subdivided into 100 . The currency was introduced after the period of French occupation and replaced the frange. It was only issued in paper money form, with notes in denominations of 25 and 50 , 1 and 20 . It was ultimately succeeded by the Albanian lek in 1926.

References

Currencies of Europe
Modern obsolete currencies 
Currencies of Albania
Currencies introduced in 1921
1926 disestablishments

1920s economic history
Modern history of Albania
1921 in economics